Tan Sri Dato' Haji Mahiaddin bin Md. Yasin (born 15 May 1947), commonly known as Muhyiddin bin Mohd. Yassin, is a Malaysian politician who served as the 8th Prime Minister of Malaysia from March 2020 to August 2021. Appointed as prime minister amid a political crisis, Muhyiddin served for 17 months and resigned after losing parliamentary support, making him the second shortest-serving prime minister in Malaysian history after Ismail Sabri Yaakob. He is the first prime minister to appoint senior ministers under his administration.

Muhyiddin grew up in the state of Johor and joined the state public service after graduating from University of Malaya (UM). He assumed management positions at various state-owned companies. In 1978, he was elected as the Member of Parliament for Pagoh. During this term, he was appointed parliamentary secretary to the minister of foreign affairs, deputy minister of federal territories and later deputy minister of trade and industry. As the Johor UMNO chief, he was the state's Menteri Besar from 1986 to 1995. He returned to federal politics in 1995. He was appointed to the Cabinet as Minister of Youth and Sports. He was appointed Minister of Domestic Trade and Consumer Affairs after the 1999 general election and became a vice president of UMNO in 2000. Under the premiership of Abdullah Ahmad Badawi, Muhyiddin served as Minister of Agriculture and Agro-based Industry from 2004 to 2008, and then as Minister of International Trade and Industry from 2008 to 2009.

In 2008, he contested and won the UMNO deputy presidency and was appointed Deputy Prime Minister and Minister of Education by Prime Minister Najib Razak in 2009. As Minister of Education, Muhyiddin ended the use of English as the medium of instruction for science and mathematics in public schools. He also attracted controversy after describing himself as "Malay first" when challenged by the Opposition to pronounce himself as "Malaysian first". Muhyiddin was a vocal critic of his government and party over the 1MDB scandal; as a result, he was dropped from his position during Najib's mid-term cabinet reshuffle in July 2015, marking the first incumbent UMNO deputy president to be left out of the president's cabinet. In June 2016, he was expelled from UMNO.

He participated in founding the political party Malaysian United Indigenous Party (BERSATU) under Mahathir in 2016. He returned to the cabinet after his coalition of parties Pakatan Harapan won the 2018 Malaysian general election. In February 2020, BERSATU withdrew from Pakatan Harapan, culminating in a political crisis as the coalition lost its majority in the Dewan Rakyat. Following Prime Minister Mahathir Mohamad's subsequent resignation, Muhyiddin successfully formed a new coalition Perikatan Nasional by receiving support from enough MPs to form a majority government and was appointed Prime Minister on 1 March.

Much of his premiership was overseeing Malaysia's response to the COVID-19 pandemic, which became a major crisis shortly after he took office. This included enacting several iterations of the Movement Control Order (MCO), a vaccination programme and declaring a 2021 state of emergency, where parliament and elections were suspended. Although his government's initial response was praised by the WHO and had high local approval ratings, the worsening of the COVID-19 crisis in 2021 attracted criticism and destabilised the coalition. On 16 August 2021, he resigned after attempts to regain support from MPs were unsuccessful. He remained caretaker Prime Minister until his replacement Ismail Sabri Yaakob was selected on 21 August 2021.

Muhyiddin unsuccessfully ran as the prime ministerial candidate for Perikatan Nasional in the 2022 general election. In March 2023, Muhyiddin was arrested by the Malaysian Anti-Corruption Commission as part of a corruption investigation on several counts of money laundering and abuse of power, making him the second former prime minister after Najib Razak, to be prosecuted.

Early life and education 
Muhyiddin was born as Mahiaddin bin Md. Yasin in Muar, Johor, Malaysia. His father, Haji Muhammad Yassin bin Muhammad, was a Malay of Bugis descent. Muhammad Yassin was an Islamic theologian and cleric based in Bandar Maharani, Muar, Johor, while his mother, Hajjah Khadijah binti Kassim, was a Malay of Javanese descent.

Muhyiddin received his primary education at Sekolah Kebangsaan Maharani, Muar, Johor, and Sekolah Kebangsaan Ismail, Muar, Johor. He received his secondary education at the Muar High School, Johor. Subsequently, he attended the University of Malaya, Kuala Lumpur. He received Bachelor of Arts (BA) in Economics and Malay studies in 1971.

Early career
After completing his studies, Muhyiddin joined the Johor state public service as the assistant secretary of training and scholarship. In 1974, he was appointed the assistant district officer (ADO) of Muar. He left the civil service to join the corporate sector in the Johor State Economic Development Corporation (PKENJ), managing its subsidiary companies like Sergam Berhad as managing director (1974–1977), Equity Mal (Johore) Sdn Bhd as Director (1974–1978), Sri Saujana Berhad as managing director (1974–1978) and SGS Ates (M) Sdn Bhd as Human Resources Manager (1974).

Early political career (1971–1995)

Early year 
Muhyiddin's involvement in politics began when he joined UMNO as an ordinary member at the Muar Dalam division in 1971. He was elected as UMNO youth chief of the Pagoh division and the secretary in 1976. Later he became Youth Chief of Johor state UMNO Youth until 1987.

Muhyiddin occupied the seats of Exco in the national Malaysia UMNO Youth. In 1984, Muhyiddin was elected the UMNO division chief of Pagoh, replacing Othman Saat. Muhyiddin rose the ranks and file of Johor UMNO quickly. From being a state executive council member, he rose to become Johor UMNO's head and later became Menteri Besar of Johor.

Muhyiddin contested and was elected Member of Parliament for the Pagoh constituency in the 1978 general election and kept the seat until 1982. Muhyiddin was appointed Parliamentary Secretary in the Ministry for Foreign Affairs; subsequently, he was promoted to Deputy Minister in the Ministry of Federal Territories and later the Ministry of Trade and Industry.

In 1984, Muhyiddin contested a UMNO Supreme Council seat but lost. Muhyiddin was later appointed the UMNO Johor state liaison chairman and next appointed a Supreme Council member. In November 1990, he was a candidate for the UMNO vice-presidency but lost again. He attempted again in the November 1993 UMNO party election, successfully this time.

Menteri Besar of Johor 

In the 1986 general election, Muhyiddin contested and won the Johor State Legislative constituency seat of Bukit Serampang, opening the path for him to become the Menteri Besar of Johor on 13 August 1986.

His tenure as Menteri Besar lasted until 6 May 1995.

Rise to prominence (1995–2009) 

Muhyiddin returned to contest the Pagoh parliamentary seat in the 1995 General Election.

He served several different federal government cabinet posts as Minister of Youth and Sports (1995–1999), Minister of Domestic Trade and Consumer Affairs (1999–2004), Minister of Agriculture and Agro-based Industry (2004–2008) and Minister of International Trade and Industry (2008–2009). He was appointed Deputy Prime Minister and Minister of Education by Prime Minister Najib Razak in 2009.

He lost the 1996 election when defending the vice-president post. Eventually, in the election in 2000, he again won the post of vice-president of UMNO, remaining in that post until the October 2008 party election, when Muhyiddin successfully sought the higher post of deputy president, which was left vacant as the incumbent, Najib Razak (who was acting party president after the retirement of Abdullah Ahmad Badawi), became UMNO president.

2009 UMNO General Assembly and party election 
Muhyiddin attacked Abdullah Ahmad Badawi's original transition plan as "too long", and some people say that at one point, Muhyiddin was about to ask and force Abdullah to quit, though he never did so directly. During the 2008 general election, Muhyiddin managed to keep his seat and remained as an UMNO leader. Shocked by the election results, he called for reforms.

During the 2009 UMNO General Assembly and party election, Muhyiddin was a candidate for the deputy president post, which was vacated by the incoming prime minister Najib Tun Razak. He was challenged by Mohd Ali Rustam, Malacca chief minister, and Muhammad Muhammad Taib, Rural and Regional Development Minister. Muhyiddin, seen as a supporter of Mahathir Mohamad, was seen to be the front-runner for the race, garnering many nominations by the UMNO divisions. Nevertheless, the competition was tough, as Taib and Rustam gained more ground, especially from the Badawi camp. Political analysts tipped the race to be very tight. However, the UMNO supreme council decided to disqualify Ali Rustam's candidacy after his assistants were caught involved with corruption after an investigation. The election resulted in Muhyiddin's election to the post with 1,575 votes to Muhammad Taib's 916.

Deputy premiership (2009–2015) 

Muhyiddin was appointed deputy prime minister on 9 April 2009, when Najib took over from Abdullah Ahmad Badawi and unveiled his first Cabinet.

Continuing as Minister for Education, he announced the decision to return to the teaching of mathematics and science in Malay in all government primary and secondary schools.

Muhyiddin waded into controversy in March 2010 by stating he was "Malay first" rather than "Malaysian first". He also said that there is nothing wrong with other races doing the same; for example, the Chinese could claim themselves to be "Chinese first, Malaysian second" and same for the Indians. On 13 July 2010, he said that anyone was free to form an association, including Chinese or Indian versions of the Malay rights group Perkasa. Prime Minister Najib came to Muhyiddin's defence, denying that his statement was inconsistent with the "1Malaysia" concept promoted by the government.

Sacked from the cabinet 
During Najib's mid-term Cabinet reshuffle on 28 July 2015, he was dropped from his position as Deputy Prime Minister. The dismissal came after Muhyiddin had made public and critical remarks about Najib's handling of the 1Malaysia Development Berhad scandal. Najib stated that Muhyiddin's dismissal, and the contemporaneous dismissals of other Ministers who had been critical of his leadership, was to create a more "unified team". Muhyiddin remained UMNO deputy president, but after keeping up criticism of UMNO, he was eventually sacked by the party's supreme council in June 2016. Muhyiddin remained unrepentant, maintaining that he had never betrayed the party and pledging to continue speaking out.

Post deputy premiership (2015–2020)

Establishment of BERSATU party 
In August 2016, Muhyiddin registered a new political party, called Parti Pribumi Bersatu Malaysia (PPBM or Bersatu for short) together with former Malaysian prime minister Mahathir Mohamad. Muhyiddin became the party's president while Mahathir and his son Mukhriz became the chairman and deputy president. The new party is focused on Bumiputera – Malays and Orang Asli – in the sense that full membership is only open to Bumiputera. Other races can join the party but cannot vote or contest in party elections.

Minister of Home Affairs 

He was appointed as Malaysian Minister of Home Affairs by Prime Minister Tun Dr. Mahathir Mohamad when Pakatan Harapan won the 14th General Election.

Prime Minister (2020–2021) 

On 29 February 2020, a week after the country was thrown into a political crisis, Muhyiddin was appointed Prime Minister by the King of Malaysia, following the abrupt resignation of Mahathir Mohamad five days before. He is the first person appointed to the position while holding both a parliamentary and state seat at the same time.

COVID-19 pandemic and movement control order 

During his administration, COVID-19 spread throughout the nation. In response, Muhyiddin implemented the Movement Control Order (MCO) on 16 March 2020 to prevent the disease from infecting more Malaysians. The MCO started nationwide from 18 March and was extended conditionally to 9 June 2020. In response to the economic impact of COVID-19, he introduced an economic stimulus package worth RM 250 billion on 27 March to soften the economic strain during the MCO.

On 1 May, in conjunction with Labour Day, Muhyiddin announced a Conditional Movement Control Order (CMCO). Certain economic sectors were allowed to operate gradually as long as SOP are followed. Travel restrictions are partially lifted to allow stranded students staying on their campuses and people who are stuck in other states to return to their respective home. Sports, recreational, and large gatherings are still prohibited under the CMCO.

On 10 May, it was announced that the CMCO will last for another four weeks until 9 June. More sectors will be allowed to operate and fewer restrictions are to be applied. Shopping malls, dine-in and non-contact sports are allowed as long as social distancing is observed.

The CMCO was converted into Recovery Movement Control Order (RMCO) and ran from 10 June until 31 August. Under the RMCO, more restrictions will be relaxed to allow the public to carry out their daily activities while complying with standard operating procedures. Almost all social, religious, business, and educational activities are allowed to resume. Hair salons, morning and night markets, and sports-related businesses like gymnasiums will open on a staggered basis, as well as religious congregation such as prayers as long as strict SOPs are followed. Reflexology centres, nightclubs, theme parks, karaoke centres, and gatherings such as kenduri (feasts) are still barred during the RMCO.

The government's COVID-19 response had a 93% approval rating in September 2020, with 69% approval for Muhyiddin himself.

Until early September 2020, Malaysia had a low number of COVID-19 cases. Infections rose following the 2020 Sabah state election in September, leading to a surge in Sabah which spread to the Klang Valley area. However, unlike the initial promise to reinstate the Movement Control Order (MCO) if the case returns to 3 digits, the government only imposed the Conditional Movement Control Order (CMCO) under the name of "economy". The government did not impose the MCO until January 2021. Nevertheless, the "MCO 2.0", was criticised for being not as strict as the "MCO 1.0" from March to May 2020.

The government's mismanagement of the second and third waves provoked widespread anger among Malaysians, such as hashtags like "#KerajaanGagal" (means Failed Government) and/or "#MuhyiddinOut" which trended online. During the third wave in the mid 2021, a "Black Flag Campaign (Bendera Hitam)" became a trend, urging Muhyiddin to immediately resign.

On July 31, 2021, hundreds of protesters gathered in Kuala Lumpur calling for Muhyiddin's resignation over his government's response to the pandemic.

Foreign relations

Myanmar 
After a bilateral meeting, Muhyiddin and Indonesian President Joko Widodo called for a special meeting of ASEAN on Myanmar after the 2021 coup d'état. After the April 2021 meeting, where representatives from the deposed National League for Democracy did not attend, Muhyiddin announced that Malaysia's three proposals to Min Aung Hlaing were not rejected, including calls to end violence against civilians during the 2021 Burmese protests, release of political detainees, and allow the Chair of ASEAN access to Myanmar.

Proclamation of emergency 

On 19 October 2020, the Yang di-Pertuan Agong Sultan Abdullah of Pahang rejected Muhyiddin's request for him to issue a proclamation of emergency in response to a spike in COVID-19 cases throughout the country. However, on 21 January 2021, a new request to issue a proclamation of emergency was granted by the Yang di-Pertuan Agong, and is expected to last until 1 August. Parliament and all elections were suspended while the proclamation was in effect.

Loss of majority support and resignation 

On 8 July 2021, UMNO withdrew support for Muhyiddin and called for his resignation in July 2021 over the handling of the COVID-19 pandemic. As well as a failure to prevent a record rise in COVID-19 infections and deaths, UMNO President Ahmad Zahid Hamidi cited the management of the severe economic impact, lack of political stability and extension of the Movement Control Order in his call for Muhyiddin to make way for a new interim premier.

On 4 August 2021, Putrajaya, Muhyiddin Yassin submitted a motion of confidence to the Yang di Pertuan Agong of Malaysia stating that he had received numerous declarations which provided that he still had the majority support within the lower house of parliament Dewan Rakyat. Therefore, the action of resignation under Federal Constitution of Malaysia under section 43(4) is neither valid nor legal. He stated that the motion of no confidence will take place in September if the parliament has doubts of his ruling. However, this statement has been rejected by opposition leader Anwar Ibrahim who claims that 112 or more MPs have rejected Perikatan Nasional. Therefore, Anwar Ibrahim's statement concludes that Muyhiddin claims are not valid and potentially fraudulent.

Following Anwar Ibrahim's statement, on 6 August 2021, Muhyiddin had stated during a press conference in Pagoh, Johor that is he is still confident that he still holds majority support within the Parliament.

On 15 August 2021, Mohd Redzuan Md Yusof, the Minister in the Prime Minister's Department (Special Functions), stated that Muhyiddin would resign on the next day. Muhyiddin and his cabinet submitted their resignation to the king on Monday, 16 August 2021.

Post-premiership (2021–present)

Chairman of the National Recovery Council

On 4 September 2021, Chief Secretary to the Government Mohd Zuki Ali announced that Muhyiddin had been appointed as Chairman of the National Recovery Council (NRC), a Cabinet minister-level position and highest position in the important council in charge of the recovery efforts of the COVID-19 pandemic based on confidence of the government in the ability of Muhyiddin in spearheading the COVID-19 pandemic recovery strategies.On 21 December 2022, Prime Minister Anwar Ibrahim dissolved NRC due to its redundancy and overlapping of duties, tasks and functions with other government agencies.

15th Malaysian general election
Perikatan Nasional announced Muhyiddin Yassin as its candidate for prime minister ahead of the 15th Malaysian general election, which was held on 19 November 2022. In the election, Perikatan Nasional won 73 seats out of 222 seats, below the 112 seats needed for a majority. After the election, Muhyiddin claimed to have a sufficient majority to be appointed as the prime minister, citing support from Perikatan Nasional, Barisan Nasional, Gabungan Parti Sarawak, and Gabungan Rakyat Sabah.
On 22 November, the royal palace stated that after the Yang di-Pertuan Agong reviewed the nominations for prime minister, he found that "no member of parliament has the majority support to be appointed prime minister", so he summoned both Muhyiddin and Anwar Ibrahim, the prime minister candidate from the rival coalition Pakatan Harapan, to see him. After the meeting, Muhyiddin said that the Yang di-Pertuan Agong proposed a unity government between Pakatan Harapan and Perikatan Nasional, but he rejected it as Perikatan Nasional "will not cooperate" with Pakatan Harapan.

Anwar Ibrahim was later appointed and sworn in as Malaysia's 10th Prime Minister on 24 November 2022, with the consent of Yang di-Pertuan Agong, Al-Sultan Abdullah, after a consultation with the Conference of Rulers of Malaysia. However, Muhyiddin continued to insist that he had the support of a majority of 115 MPs to form the next government and called on Anwar to prove his majority.

Controversies and issues

Alleged misuse of RMAF helicopter 
Muhyiddin, as the Deputy Prime Minister, has used a RMAF Nuri helicopter to attend and open UMNO's divisional assembly in the interior of Sabah, which has nothing to do with his official duties. His actions have been strongly criticized by the federal opposition led by Lim Kit Siang as it was a misuse of his powers as Deputy Prime Minister. Lim even questioned whether the Malaysian Anti-Corruption Commission (MACC) would investigate Muhyiddin, as MACC has been conducting various investigations into assemblymen in states controlled by Lim's Pakatan Rakyat.

Racial views 
On 31 March 2010, Muhyiddin attracted contr declaring himself as a "Malay first" rather than a "Malaysian first" when responding to Democratic Action Party (DAP) leader Lim Kit Siang's challenge in the parliament for him to state whether he is a Malay or a Malaysian first. However, Muhyiddin retorted although he is Malay first, that doesn't mean he being Malay is not Malaysian. The Prime Minister Najib Razak defended Muhyiddin's "Malay first, Malaysian second" assertion and controversial statement even though it contradicts the 1Malaysia concept which talks of "a nation where, it is hoped, every Malaysian perceives himself or herself as Malaysian first, and by race, religion, geographical region or socio-economic background second".

Muhyiddin attracted criticism again on 12 April 2010 by calling the members of a new inter-faith committee 'small fry', causing strong reaction from the public and uproar from the Malaysian Consultative Council of Buddhism, Christianity, Hinduism, Sikhism and Taoism (MCCBCHST) to back off from joining the committee for the time being. Muhyiddin was quick to deny he ever say that and stated he was misquoted. Muhyiddin later doubled down and uttered 'Yes, I am Malay first and no apologies'.

Legal name dispute 
On 2 April 2021, the Shah Alam court has reversed a preventive detention order signed by him during his time as the Minister of Home Affairs because he signed the order using his unofficial name, Muhyiddin bin Mohd. Yassin instead of his legal name/birth name, Mahiaddin bin Md. Yasin.

Involvement in the Sheraton Move

Following political infighting within Pakatan Harapan, BERSATU President Muhyiddin Yassin, PAS President Abdul Hadi Awang, PKR Deputy President Azmin Ali, and UMNO leaders Abdul Hadi Awang and Ismail Sabri Yaakob formed the Perikatan Nasional government which led to a loss of parliamentary majority for the ruling Pakatan Harapan coalition, ultimately resulting in Mahathir Mohamad's resignation as Prime Minister. This moment is widely regarded as the start of the Malaysian political crisis. Following its formation, the Perikatan Nasional government was the target of scathing criticism, with many calling its existence "democratically illegitimate" or more colloquially, a "backdoor government".

"Christianisation" claim 
During a campaign speech on 17 November 2022, Muhyiddin accused Pakatan Harapan of working with Jews and Christians to "Christianise the country". He backed his claim by saying "I saw a video where a group of Jews were talking about Malaysia and were praying for the country to fall into the hands of the opposition, which has been sponsoring these groups of Jews and Christians. For me this is dangerous. Is a Christianisation process going to happen?". His remarks was condemned as religiously insensitive by the Council of Churches of Malaysia. Muhyiddin defended himself and claimed that he was taken out of context by saying that his speech was 55 minutes long, and that the remark was only 1 minute and 35 seconds long. He also claimed he was merely commenting on a supposed video clip that allegedly showed "foreign religious groups" praying for Pakatan Harapan to win.

2023 corruption charges 
On 9 March 2023, Muhyiddin was detained by the Malaysian Anti-Corruption Commission after being questioned over a Covid-19 economic recovery package launched by his government. Muhyiddin denied the allegations. He was accused of sourcing $51m in bribes from companies who hoped to benefit from the emergency government spending program, and charged with gratification and money laundering. He allegedly abused his position for gratification from three entities and an individual for his ally, Bersatu. He pleaded not guilty on the charges. Judge Azura then fixed bail at RM2mil in two sureties and ordered Muhyiddin to surrender his passport. The case is being viewed by many Malaysians as a result of intense political rivalry which emerged after the defeat of Malaysia's incumbent political party, UMNO, in the 2018 Malaysian general election.

Personal life

Family 
He married Noorainee Abdul Rahman in 1972 and has 4 children; 2 sons and 2 daughters, namely Fakhri Yassin Mahiaddin, Nabilah Mahiaddin,  and Farhan Yassin Mahiaddin respectively. All of his children are heavily involved in business and corporate, entertainment or writing industries. His son, Fakhri Yassin, was a corporate figure in Malaysia and assumed the position of Executive Chairman. The second child, Nabilah was involved in book writing while Najwa and Farhan Yassin shared the same interest in the entertainment industry.

Sport 
He is an avid golf lover.

Health issues 
In the aftermath of 2018 general election (GE14), Muhyiddin was diagnosed with an early-stage tumour in the pancreas. He had spent one month in Mount Elizabeth Hospital, Singapore from July to August 2018, during which he underwent a surgery to extract the tumour. The operation was successful and he returned to Malaysia in stable condition. He was scheduled for a series of follow-up chemotherapy treatment after Hari Raya Haji, for up to six months. He told reporters at the Parliament, "for cancer cases such as this, it is normal to go through follow-up treatment including chemotherapy for 12 rounds over the duration of six months."

Based on medical advice, Muhyiddin took a one-month medical leave to recover post-surgery. Prime Minister Mahathir Mohamad took charge of the Ministry of Home Affairs during Muhyiddin's absence.

On 22 May 2020, Muhyiddin entered into a 14-day quarantine after an officer who attended the post-Cabinet meeting at the Prime Minister's Office on 21 May tested positive for COVID-19. On 4 June 2020, he completed the 14-day quarantine period and was tested negative for COVID-19. Therefore, he was allowed to return to the workplace to discharge his official duties as Prime Minister.

On 9 February 2022, he confirmed that he had tested positive for COVID-19, was experiencing mild symptoms and would be undergoing quarantine.

Election results

Honours

Honours of Malaysia
:
  Commander of the Order of Loyalty to the Crown of Malaysia (PSM) – Tan Sri (1988)
:
  Second Class of the Sultan Ibrahim Medal (PIS II) (1974)
  Second Class of the Star of Sultan Ismail (BSI II) (1979)
  Companion of the Order of the Crown of Johor (SMJ) (1980)
  Knight Grand Commander of the Order of the Crown of Johor (SPMJ) – Dato' (1991)
 :
  Grand Commander of the Order of Loyalty to Sultan Abdul Halim Mu'adzam Shah (SHMS) – Dato' Seri Diraja (2014)
 :
  Knight Grand Commander of the Exalted Order of Malacca (DUNM) – Datuk Seri Utama (2019)
 :
  Ordinary Class of the Perak Family Order of Sultan Azlan Shah (SPSA) – Dato' Seri Diraja (2010)
 :
  Knight Grand Commander of the Order of the Crown of Perlis, the Star of Safi (SPMP) – Dato' Seri (2007)
 :
  Principal Grand Knight of the Order of Loyalty to Negeri Sembilan (SUNS) – Dato' Seri Utama (2010)
:
  Grand Commander of the Order of Kinabalu (SPDK) – Datuk Seri Panglima (2010)
:
  Knight Commander of the Order of the Star of Sarawak (PNBS) – Dato Sri (2008)
  Knight Grand Commander of the Order of the Star of Hornbill Sarawak (DP) – Datuk Patinggi (2010)

Honorary degrees 

 :
 2012 International Honorary Doctorate from United States Sports Academy (2013)
 :
 Honorary Doctor of Letters (Litt.D.) degree from Beijing Foreign Studies University (2014)

Honorary plaque 
 :
 Honorary Plaque of the City of Sarajevo (2016)

See also
Pagoh (federal constituency)
List of international prime ministerial trips made by Muhyiddin Yassin

Notes

References

External links
 Deputy Prime Minister of Malaysia Official Website
 Johor Menteri Besar Office|Menteri Besar Biography|Tan Sri Muhyiddin Yassin
 My KMU Johor|Tan Sri Muhyiddin Yassin
 Johorean Student Society|Persatuan Mahasiswa Anak Johor (PERMAJ)|National University of Malaysia|Universiti Kebangsaan Malaysia (UKM)|Biografi Mantan Menteri Besar Johor

1947 births
Living people
People from Johor
People from Muar
Malaysian people of Bugis descent
Malaysian people of Javanese descent
Malaysian people of Malay descent
Malaysian people of Indonesian descent
Malaysian Muslims
Malaysian political party founders
Leaders of political parties in Malaysia
Malaysian United Indigenous Party politicians
Former United Malays National Organisation politicians
Independent politicians in Malaysia
Members of the Dewan Rakyat
Members of the Johor State Legislative Assembly
Chief Ministers of Johor
Prime Ministers of Malaysia
Deputy Prime Ministers of Malaysia
Government ministers of Malaysia
Agriculture ministers of Malaysia
Education ministers of Malaysia
Home ministers of Malaysia
Industry ministers of Malaysia
Trade ministers of Malaysia
Johor state executive councillors
University of Malaya alumni
Commanders of the Order of Loyalty to the Crown of Malaysia
Knights Commander of the Most Exalted Order of the Star of Sarawak
Knights Grand Commander of the Order of the Star of Hornbill Sarawak
20th-century Malaysian politicians
21st-century Malaysian politicians
Knights Grand Commander of the Order of the Crown of Johor
Grand Commanders of the Order of Kinabalu
People charged with corruption